Bruel may refer to:

Family
Brüel (family), a branch of the  German noble family von Brühl

Places
Brüel, town in the Ludwigslust-Parchim district, in Mecklenburg-Western Pomerania, Germany

Persons
Birgit Brüel (1927-1996), Danish singer and actress
Joachim Bruel (Brulius), theologian and historian, born early in the seventeenth century
Max Brüel (1927-1995), Danish architect and jazz musician, an accomplished pianist and saxophonist
Nick Bruel, American author and illustrator of children's books, most notably the Bad Kitty series
Patrick Bruel, (born 1959), French singer, actor, and professional poker

Business
Brüel & Kjær, Danish multinational engineering and electronics company